Giovanni Busato (1806–1886) was an Italian painter, active both in oil and frescoes.

Biography
He was born in Vicenza and initially trained at the Academy of Fine Arts of Venice under Teodoro Matteini. He was later elected instructor of design for the Academy. He travelled widely both within Italy and France, Belgium, England, Russia, and Germany. He submitted an entry for the theater curtain (sipario) for the Fenice theater of Venice, but completed such works for theaters in Trieste, Sinigallia, Corfu, and Ravenna. He also restored a sipario found in St Petersburg which had been painted by Cosroe Dusi. He painted four large canvases for the Cathedral of Schio.

References

1806 births
1886 deaths
People from Vicenza
19th-century Italian painters
Italian male painters
Painters from Venice
Accademia di Belle Arti di Venezia alumni
Academic staff of the Accademia di Belle Arti di Venezia
19th-century Italian male artists